Nagao Fujikage (長尾藤景) (d. 1568) was a samurai of the Nagao clan who served under Uesugi Kenshin during Japan's Sengoku period. He was counted among Kenshin's Twenty-Eight Generals.

He fought on the left flank at the fourth Battle of Kawanakajima in 1561.

In 1568, Honjō Shigenaga murdered  Fujikage, and captured his castle.

References

Turnbull, Stephen (1998). The Samurai Sourcebook. London: Cassell & Co.

Samurai
16th-century Japanese people